Air Commodore Otuekong Idongesit Nkanga  (27 January 1952 – 24 December 2020) was a Nigerian former Air Commodore.

Career
He was governor of Akwa Ibom State in Nigeria from September 1990 to January 1992 during the military regime of General Ibrahim Babangida, handing over to an elected civilian Governor at the start of the Nigerian Third Republic. Idongesit Nkanga

When appointed in 1990, his deputy governor was Obong Ufot Ekaette, who later became Secretary to the Government of the Federation.
The Akwa Ibom Broadcasting Corporation was established by edict in April 1988. Wing Commander Nkanga officially commissioned the station on 27 July  1991.

In May 2001, Nkanga became a member of the board of the Cooperative Development Bank.
In 2002, he was said to seeking to be candidate for the Nigeria Democratic Party (NDP) in the 2003 elections for Governor of Akwa-Ibom State.
In 2007, Nkanga was appointed Chairman of the Akwa Ibom Airport Implementation Committee. The International airport was opened on November 26, 2009
Although the primary focus was on cargo traffic and airplane maintenance repair and overhaul, the airport started by serving commercial local passenger flights.

In December 2009, as an elder of the Ibibio people he was a strong supporter of Akwa-Ibom Governor Godswill Akpabio.
In January 2010, he was a member of the South-South Elders and Leaders' Forum. Discussing the issue of handing over from the ailing President Umaru Yar'Adua to Vice-president Goodluck Jonathan, he said the issue was not a north–south one, but was about following the constitution.

Death
Nkanga died from COVID-19 on 24 December 2020, aged 69.

References

2020 deaths
National Democratic Party (Nigeria) politicians
Nigerian military governors of Akwa Ibom State
Ibibio people
1952 births
Deaths from the COVID-19 pandemic in Nigeria